Port Harcourt Zoo (also known as PH Zoo) is a state owned zoological park in Port Harcourt city of Rivers State in Nigeria.

Located within Trans Amadi, in Rivers State, Port  Harcourt Zoo has been ranked among the major tourist attractions in the city and is considered one of  Nigeria's leading conservation centres. The Port Harcourt International Airport is approximately 14 miles (22.5 km) northwest of the park.

By 18 June 2012, the Rivers State government had announced plans to introduce new animals to the  zoo and completely revamp its state to match global standards.

See also

 List of zoos

References

External links

Zoo
Zoos established in 1974
Obio-Akpor
Landmarks in Port Harcourt
Organizations based in Port Harcourt
1975 establishments in Nigeria
1970s establishments in Rivers State
Zoos in Nigeria